Giovanni Casale (born 20 June 1980 in Messina, Italy) is an Italian judoka. He competed in the 60–66 kg category at the 2008 Summer Olympics.

Achievements

References

1980 births
Living people
Italian male judoka
Judoka at the 2008 Summer Olympics
Olympic judoka of Italy
Sportspeople from Messina
Mediterranean Games silver medalists for Italy
Mediterranean Games medalists in judo
Competitors at the 2005 Mediterranean Games
20th-century Italian people
21st-century Italian people